Cavaleiro, the Portuguese word for "knight" and a common surname, can refer to:

 Deonise Cavaleiro (1983), Brazilian handball player 
 Fernando Cavaleiro (1917–2012), Portuguese equestrian
 Ivan Cavaleiro (1993), Portuguese professional footballer
 Nuno Cavaleiro (1976), Portuguese retired footballer

Portuguese-language surnames
Surnames from status names